Bucculatrix benacicolella is a moth in the family Bucculatricidae. It was described by Friedrich Hartig in 1937. It is found in Italy, Hungary, Serbia and North Macedonia.

The larvae feed on Artemisia alba. They mine the leaves of their host plant.
The mine starts at the leaf margin. From there, the larvae create elongated fleck mines. Larvae can be found in June.

References

External links
 Images representing Bucculatrix benacicolella at Consortium for the Barcode of Life

Bucculatricidae
Moths described in 1937
Moths of Europe
Leaf miners